The 1981 West Texas State Buffaloes football team was an American football team that represented West Texas State University (now known as West Texas A&M University) as a member of the Missouri Valley Conference during the 1981 NCAA Division I-A football season. In their fifth year under head coach Bill Yung, the team compiled a 7–4 record (3–3 in the MVC).

Schedule

References

West Texas State
West Texas A&M Buffaloes football seasons
West Texas State Buffaloes football